Belgium participated in the Eurovision Song Contest 2018 with the song "A Matter of Time" written by Laura Groeseneken, Alex Callier and Maxime Tribeche. The song was performed by Sennek, which is the artistic name of singer Laura Groeseneken who was internally selected by the Flemish broadcaster Vlaamse Radio- en Televisieomroeporganisatie (VRT) in September 2017 to represent the nation at the 2018 contest in Lisbon, Portugal. The song, "A Matter of Time", was presented to the public on 5 March 2018.

Belgium was drawn to compete in the first semi-final of the Eurovision Song Contest which took place on 8 May 2018. Performing during the show in position 4, "A Matter of Time" was not announced among the top 10 entries of the first semi-final and therefore did not qualify to compete in the final. It was later revealed that Belgium placed twelfth out of the 19 participating countries in the semi-final with 91 points.

Background

In 2016, Blanche represented the country with the song "City Lights", qualifying to the final and placing fourth.

The Belgian broadcaster for the 2018 contest, who broadcasts the event in Belgium and organises the selection process for its entry, was Vlaamse Radio- en Televisieomroeporganisatie (VRT). The Belgian participation in the contest alternates between two broadcasters: the Flemish VRT and the Walloon Radio Télévision Belge de la Communauté Française (RTBF). Both broadcasters have selected the Belgian entry using national finals and internal selections in the past. In 2016, VRT organised the national final Eurosong in order to select the Belgian entry, while in 2017, RTBF internally selected a contestant from the reality singing competition The Voice Belgique to represent the nation. On 9 May 2017, VRT confirmed Belgium's participation in the 2018 Eurovision Song Contest and internally selected both the artist and song.

Before Eurovision

Internal selection 
The Belgian entry for the 2018 Eurovision Song Contest was selected via an internal selection by VRT. On 14 September 2017, the broadcaster's spokesperson Hans Van Goethem revealed that the artist would be selected by an A&R Team (Arts and Repertoire) consisting of music experts following conversations with several acts and that they were close to reaching a decision. On 28 September 2017, it was announced during the Één talk show Van Gils & Gasten that Laura Groeseneken (Sennek) would represent Belgium in Lisbon. Among artists that were previously rumoured to be selected for the competition included Belle Perez, De Romeo's, Isabelle A, Belgian Eurovision Song Contest 2006 participant Kate Ryan, Natalia and Ozark Henry. On 24 January 2018, Sennek revealed that the song she would perform at the contest, which she described as a "unique pop song with a mysterious feeling", was written and composed by herself.

The song, "A Matter of Time", was set to be presented to the public on 6 March 2018 during the radio MNM programme De Grote Peter Van de Veire Ochtendshow, however it was released on 5 March 2018 following an online leak. The song was written by Sennek herself along with member of the band Hooverphonic, Alex Callier, and Maxime Tribeche. In regards to the song, Sennek stated: "The song describes the way you can find beauty in transience, how you can see the beauty in something precious that gets broken."

Promotion 
Sennek made several appearances across Europe to specifically promote "A Matter of Time" as the Belgian Eurovision entry. Between 8 and 11 April, Sennek took part in promotional activities in Tel Aviv, Israel and performed during the Israel Calling event held at the Rabin Square. On 14 April, Sennek performed during the Eurovision in Concert event which was held at the AFAS Live venue in Amsterdam, Netherlands and hosted by Edsilia Rombley and Cornald Maas. On 21 April, Sennek performed during the ESPreParty event which was held at the Sala La Riviera venue in Madrid, Spain and hosted by Soraya Arnelas.

At Eurovision 
According to Eurovision rules, all nations with the exceptions of the host country and the "Big Five" (France, Germany, Italy, Spain and the United Kingdom) are required to qualify from one of two semi-finals in order to compete for the final; the top ten countries from each semi-final progress to the final. The European Broadcasting Union (EBU) split up the competing countries into six different pots based on voting patterns from previous contests, with countries with favourable voting histories put into the same pot. On 29 January 2018, a special allocation draw was held which placed each country into one of the two semi-finals, as well as which half of the show they would perform in. Belgium was placed into the first semi-final, to be held on 8 May 2018, and was scheduled to perform in the first half of the show.

Once all the competing songs for the 2018 contest had been released, the running order for the semi-finals was decided by the shows' producers rather than through another draw, so that similar songs were not placed next to each other. Belgium was set to perform in position 4, following the entry from Albania and before the entry from the Czech Republic.

The two semi-finals and the final was broadcast in Belgium by both the Flemish and Walloon broadcasters. VRT broadcast the shows on één with commentary in Dutch by Peter Van de Veire. RTBF televised the shows on La Une with commentary in French by Jean-Louis Lahaye and Maureen Louys; the second semi-final aired on a 90-minute delay on La Une. The Belgian spokesperson, who announced the top 12-point score awarded by the Belgian jury during the final, was Danira Boukhriss.

Semi-final

Sennek took part in technical rehearsals on 29 April and 3 May, followed by dress rehearsals on 7 and 8 May. This included the jury show on 7 May where the professional juries of each country watched and voted on the competing entries.

The Belgian performance featured Sennek in a black transparent dress designed by Veronique Branquinho and performing on the outer ring of the stage. The performance began with a small panel of light that focused on Sennek's hands as she moved to reveal her eyes, while the stage remained dark throughout the song. The Belgian performance was directed by Hans Pannecoucke. Three off-stage backing vocalists joined Sennek during the performance: Monique Harcum, Nina Babet and Stef Caers.

At the end of the show, Belgium was not announced among the top 10 entries in the first semi-final and therefore failed to qualify to compete in the final. It was later revealed that Belgium placed twelfth in the semi-final, receiving a total of 91 points: 20 points from the televoting and 71 points from the juries.

Voting
Voting during the three shows involved each country awarding two sets of points from 1-8, 10 and 12: one from their professional jury and the other from televoting. Each nation's jury consisted of five music industry professionals who are citizens of the country they represent, with their names published before the contest to ensure transparency. This jury judged each entry based on: vocal capacity; the stage performance; the song's composition and originality; and the overall impression by the act. In addition, no member of a national jury was permitted to be related in any way to any of the competing acts in such a way that they cannot vote impartially and independently. The individual rankings of each jury member as well as the nation's televoting results were released shortly after the grand final.

Below is a breakdown of points awarded to Belgium and awarded by Belgium in the first semi-final and grand final of the contest, and the breakdown of the jury voting and televoting conducted during the two shows:

Points awarded to Belgium

Points awarded by Belgium

Detailed voting results
The following members comprised the Belgian jury:
  (jury chairperson)singer, songwriter, musician, manager, represented Belgium in the 1991 contest as part of Clouseau
 Wouter Vander Vekenmusic producer
 Laura Tesorosinger, represented Belgium in the 2016 contest
 Tom Eeckhout (Tom Dice)singer, songwriter, represented Belgium in the 2010 contest
 Nathalie Delporteradio DJ

References 

2018
Countries in the Eurovision Song Contest 2018
Eurovision